The Boulevard Line is a railway line in Copenhagen, Denmark.

Boulevard Line may also refer to the following transit lines:
Boulevard Line (Brooklyn) - Boulevard is now University Parkway
Broadway Line (Midtown Manhattan surface), previously the Boulevard Line